The Palaiofarsalos to Kalambaka railway is a standard-gauge railway line that connects Kalambaka with the mainline station of Palaiofarsalos in Thessaly, Greece. Originally opened as a metre-gauge railway in 1886, it was converted to standard gauge in 2001.

Route
The southern terminus of the line is Palaiofarsalos railway station near Farsala. It continues to Karditsa and Trikala, and advances north-northwest to the northern terminus in Kalambaka.

The duration of the regular stopping service between Athens and Kalambaka is 4 hours and 11 minutes, but faster travel times can be achieved by taking the InterCity service to Thessaloniki and changing trains at Palaiofarsalos.

Stations
The stations on the Palaiofarsalos–Kalambaka railway are:
 Palaiofarsalos railway station (connecting to Athens and Thessaloniki)
 Karditsa railway station
 Trikala railway station 
 Kalambaka railway station

History
The metre-gauge railway from Palaiofarsalos to Kalambaka was inaugurated on 16 June 1886 as part of the Thessaly Railways, with services to and from Volos.

After the First World War, the Greek state had planned the ambitious construction of several new rail lines and links, including a standard gauge line from Kalambaka onto Kozani and then Veroia creating a conversion of the route from Volos to Kalambaka on standard gauge. In 1927, the relevant decisions were made; starting in 1928, work was carried out on the construction of the new line from Kalambaka. But a year later, it was clear that the project would exceed the estimated costs many times over. In 1932, the construction work was stopped and remains unfinished.

Freight traffic declined sharply when the state-imposed monopoly of OSE for the transport of agricultural products and fertilisers ended in the early 1990s. Many smaller stations on the network (with little passenger traffic) were closed, especially on the mainline section between Karditsa and Kalampaka.

In early 2001, the decision was taken to upgrade the line from 600 mm gauge to standard gauge and physically connect at Palaiofarsalos with the mainline from Athens to Thessaloniki. In 2001 the section between Kalampaka and Palaiofarsalos was converted from 600 mm gauge to standard gauge and physically connected at Palaiofarsalos with the mainline from Athens to Thessaloniki. Since to upgrade, however, travel times improved and the unification of rail gauge allowed direct services, even InterCity services, to link Volos and Kalambaka with Athens and Thessaloniki. During the conversion, several smaller stations were closed; however, travel times improved, and the unification of rail gauge allowed direct services, even InterCity services, to link Kalambaka with Athens and Thessaloniki.

Services
The Palaiofarsalos–Kalambaka railway is used by the following passenger services:
Regional Palaiofarsalos-Kalambaka. The journey takes around 48 mins.

Future

Upgrade
In early 2018 TrainOSE announced the upgrade of the line. This upgrade will involve doubling the track and full electrification from Kalambaka (allowing faster nonstopping services to Athens and Thessaloniki) with the installation of new signalling and ETCS Level 1 system on the existing single-track railway line. The tendering process was set for 11 October 2018, with funding being allocated to Operational Programme THESSALY 2014-2020. With a completion date of 2022. The time for Athens to Kalampakas will be reduced to 2 hours and 50 minutes, Athens to Karditsa 2 hours and Athens to Trikala 2 hours and 40 minutes. The projected costs estimate are set at €46,6500.

Extensions 
East: Kalambaka - Grevena - Siatista - Kozani - Panagia Soumela Vermiou - Veria
According to press reports, there is OSE's planning for line extensions, from Kalambaka to Grevena, Siatista and Kozani at first stage

West: Kalampaka-Ioannina-Igoumenitsa (project duration from the completion of the study: 5 years). In the projected second stage expansion from Kalambaka to Ioannina and Igoumenitsa in the framework of the Railway Egnatia. The expansion stations will be: Kalambaka-Malakasi-Anthochori-Ioannina-Kastritsa-Agios Nikolaos-Kristallopigi-Igoumenitsa.

References

External links
OSE

Railway lines in Greece
Standard gauge railways in Greece
Railway lines opened in 1886
1886 establishments in Greece